Eucalyptus bunyip is a rare, slender tree that is endemic to a small area near Tonimbuk in Victoria. It has smooth, light coloured bark, glossy green egg-shaped to broadly lance-shaped adult leaves, club-shaped buds arranged in groups of seven, white flowers and bell-shaped fruit on a relatively long pedicel.

Description
Mature trees have large numbers of intermediate leaves in the crown. They are more or less the same colour on both surfaces. Flowering occurs in autumn and the flowers are white.

Taxonomy and naming
Eucalyptus bunyip was first formally described in 2012 by Kevin James Rule and the description was published in the journal Muelleria from a specimen collected in the Bunyip State Park. The specific epithet (bunyip) is a reference to the type location.

Distribution and habitat
This eucalypt is a rare tree that grows in the valley floors on the Diamond and Black Snake Creeks in the Bunyip State Park.

References

Flora of Victoria (Australia)
Trees of Australia
bunyip
Myrtales of Australia
Plants described in 2012